Thupatemi Stadium is a multi-purpose stadium in Pathum Thani, Thailand.  It is currently used mostly for football matches and is the home stadium of Air Force Central Football Club.  The stadium holds 25,000 people. The stadium was owned by Royal Thai Air Force.

References 

Football venues in Thailand
Multi-purpose stadiums in Thailand
Buildings and structures in Pathum Thani province